SABA (Schwarzwälder Apparate-Bau-Anstalt lit. Black Forest Apparatus Construction Institution) is a German electronics company founded in 1923 at Triberg im Schwarzwald (Black Forest), present-day Baden-Württemberg. SABA started as a clock-making company, then became a radio manufacturer, and a few years later a record label. In 1968, SABA sold the majority of the company to GTE, an American telephone company. In 1980, the company was purchased by Thomson SA and integrated as a separate business unit.

History
SABA began as a clock-maker in Triberg (Black Forest), founded in 1835 by Joseph Benedikt Schwer. In 1918 it moved to Villingen. Herman Schwer, the founder's grandson, started the manufacturing of headphones, radio parts, and a variety of products from radio components to receivers.

In 1931, SABA produced more than 100,000 units of the SABA Radio Type S-35. It introduced for the first time on the market dynamic loudspeakers which soon became a bestseller. The company developed the first radio receiver with search and automatic fine tuning in all bandwidths. In 1951, IFA, a consumer industry electronics show in Berlin allowed SABA to show their first TV receiver. SABA successes enabled the company to manufacture tape recorders. It introduced the large TV screen projector 'Telerama' on the market, and it launched the first color TV with wireless remote control.

Purchase
In 1968, the American Company GTE purchased 85% of SABA with the aim of achieving the greatest possible synergy with its own Sylvania brand. SABA built the first hi-fi audio set with wireless remote control and introduced a failure diagnosis system. SABA launched first modularized color TV built only of pluggable sub-assembly boards. In 1973, SABA was at this period a serious competitor to the leading Telefunken and Grundig brands. In 1976, SABA became a subsidiary of the American company GTE

Thomson era
In 1980, GTE left consumer electronic distribution. Thomson-Brandt, a consumer electronics group with headquarters in Paris, took over 100% of SABA-Werke GmbH (Villingen). The brand became one of the market leaders in video and created the first German video training school. Ten years later, SABA launched the first portable LCD television. The production of the TV sets was switched to the most modern, fully automatic production lines with new, comprehensive color television set technologies. 60% of the new television chassis was digitized. Its functionality and reliability set new standards. In 1987, the "Quality Dealer Distribution System" was introduced in Germany with the strong involvement of the wholesale trade, specialist retail purchasing groups and the qualified wholesale sales markets.

SABA launched several products designed by Philippe Starck, the director of consumer electronics at Thomson. These included: "Jim Nature" (1994), a portable TV set made of recycled high-density wood, now exhibited in the Museum of Modern Art (MoMA) in New York City, and "Oye-Oye", a small radio with an innovative form factor.

In 2010, Thomson finalized a restructuring leading to a better focus on its B2B activities and a change of its company name to Technicolor. The brand SABA remains in the ownership of Technicolor SA (ex-Thomson) which relies on several companies to manufacture and commercialize SABA products.

Today, the products of the SABA brand are offered and sold in many European countries as well as in some other countries outside of the EU.

Record label
Saba had a record label founded by Hans Georg Brunner-Schwer, grandson of the electronics company's founder, to produce music for automobile tape players. In 1967 Saba's catalogue included Oscar Peterson, Nathan Davis, and the Clarke-Boland Big Band. Saba bought distribution rights from Prestige Records. Saba's parent company was bought by an American company that discontinued the recording operation. Brunner-Schwer then established MPS Records.

References

External links
 

Electronics companies of Germany
Jazz record labels
Radio manufacturers